Kullilaid is an island belonging to the country of Estonia.

See also

 List of islands of Estonia

  

Islands of Estonia
Saaremaa Parish